Central Catholic High School is a Roman Catholic high school in West Point, Nebraska, United States.  It is located in the Roman Catholic Archdiocese of Omaha.

Athletics
Central Catholic is a member of the Nebraska School Activities Association. The school has won the following NSAA State Championships:

 Girls' volleyball - 2001, 2002, 2003, 2004 (runner-up - 1999, 2006)
 Boys' basketball - 1998, 1999, 2010 (runner-up - 2003,2017)
 Girls' basketball - 2002, 2003, 2004, 2005 (runner-up - 2006), 2017
 Boys' football - 2010, (runner-up-2011,2017)

References

External links
 School website

Catholic secondary schools in Nebraska
Roman Catholic Archdiocese of Omaha
Schools in Cuming County, Nebraska